Joël Mohammed Ramzan Piroe (born 2 August 1999) is a Dutch professional footballer who plays as a forward for Swansea City.

Club career

Early career
Piroe started playing football at the age of five for SCE Nijmegen and played youth football for Quick 1888 and SC Woezik, after which he was signed to the youth academy of NEC. He first played as a left-back and left midfielder. The coach of the under-12 team of NEC chose to play Piroe as a forward, due to the many goals he scored. He then moved to the youth academy of Feyenoord, and a year later – in 2014 – joined the PSV academy. He signed his first professional contract with the Eindhoven-based club in November 2016.

Piroe made his professional debut in the Eerste Divisie for Jong PSV on 2 December 2016 in a game against Achilles '29.

PSV sent Piroe on a one-year loan to Sparta Rotterdam in August 2019. He made his debut in the Eredivisie on 25 August 2019, coming on for Ragnar Ache in the 60th minute away against PEC Zwolle – a game which ended in a 2–2 draw.

Swansea City
On 2 July 2021, Piroe moved to Wales to join Swansea City on a three-year deal, joining for an undisclosed fee, reported to be in the region of £1 million with the potential to rise up to £2 million. He scored on his Swansea debut in an EFL Cup tie against Reading on 10 August 2021.

Personal life
Born in the Netherlands, Piroe is of Surinamese descent.

Career statistics

Honours 
Individual
 UEFA European Under-19 Championship Golden Boot: 2017

References

External links
 
 

1999 births
Living people
Dutch sportspeople of Surinamese descent
People from Wijchen
Association football forwards
Dutch footballers
Jong PSV players
PSV Eindhoven players
Sparta Rotterdam players
Quick 1888 players
NEC Nijmegen players
Feyenoord players
SC Woezik players
Swansea City A.F.C. players
Eredivisie players
Eerste Divisie players
Dutch expatriate footballers
Expatriate footballers in Wales
Dutch expatriate sportspeople in Wales
Footballers from Gelderland